Jared Moshe is an American-born director, screenwriter and producer of independent films. He wrote and directed the feature Westerns Dead Man's Burden (2012) and The Ballad of Lefty Brown (2017). He has also produced the features Destricted (2006), Kurt Cobain: About a Son (2006), Low and Behold (2007), Beautiful Losers (2008), Corman's World: Exploits of a Hollywood Rebel (2011), and Silver Tongues (2011).

Early life 
Moshe grew up in Chappaqua, NY. He is a graduate of Horace Greeley High School and Amherst College.

Career 
Moshe began his producing career with Kurt Cobain: About a Son, which premiered at the 2006 Toronto Film Festival and was nominated for an Independent Spirit Award. The film was produced under Moshe's Sidetrack Films banner, a financing and production company. Among the other films produced by Moshe at Sidetrack were Low and Behold, which premiered at the 2007 Sundance Film Festival, and Beautiful Losers, which played at the 2008 SXSW Film Festival and 2008 Locarno Film Festival.

Under his Stick! Pictures banner, Moshe executive produced Corman's World: Exploits of a Hollywood Rebel, a feature-length documentary exploring the career of Hollywood director Roger Corman. Interviewed celebrities include Robert De Niro, Quentin Tarantino, Jack Nicholson, Martin Scorsese, and Ron Howard, among others. The film was shown at the 2011 Sundance Film Festival and the 2011 Cannes Film Festival. It was distributed by A&E.

He also produced Silver Tongues, starring Lee Tergesen and Enid Graham. At the 2011 Slamdance Film Festival, Silver Tongues was given the Audience Award for Best Narrative Film, and was also nominated for an Independent Spirit Award. The movie was released by Virgil Films.

Moshe made the transition to writer-director with the feature Western Dead Man's Burden, starring Clare Bowen, David Call, and Barlow Jacobs. The film premiered at the 2012 Los Angeles Film Festival. It was released theatrically by Cinedigm.

Moshe's most recent film is The Ballad of Lefty Brown (2017), starring Bill Pullman, Kathy Baker, Jim Caviezel, Tommy Flanagan, and Peter Fonda.

References

External links 
 

American film directors
Western (genre) film directors
American screenwriters
American film producers
Year of birth missing (living people)
Living people
Horace Greeley High School alumni
Amherst College alumni